The 2016 NBA All-Star Game was an exhibition basketball game that was played on February 14, 2016, during the National Basketball Association's (NBA) 2015–16 season. It was the 65th edition of the NBA All-Star Game, and was played at Air Canada Centre in Toronto, home of the Toronto Raptors. The Western Conference defeated the Eastern Conference, 196–173. Russell Westbrook was named the All-Star Game Most Valuable Player. The Raptors were awarded the All-Star Game in an announcement on September 30, 2013. This was the first time that the NBA All-Star Game was held outside the United States. TSN and Sportsnet televised the game nationally in Canada, while TNT and TBS televised the game nationally in the United States. This was also the 18th and final All-Star Game in which Kobe Bryant participated, as a result of his retirement after the season.

Background
Toronto's bid to host the 2016 NBA All-Star Game was led by NBA Canada vice-president and managing director Dan MacKenzie. It was the culmination of years of planning to grow basketball in Canada, and by 2013 he stated that "the time was right" to bring the event outside of the United States for the first time. He estimated that it would bring $80 million to $100 million into Toronto's economy. He also highlighted that the NBA had 650,000 Canadian followers on Twitter by 2016.

All-Star Game

Coaches
Although the Golden State Warriors had the best record in the Western Conference, no coach may coach two consecutive All-Star Games, therefore making Steve Kerr ineligible. San Antonio Spurs head coach Gregg Popovich served as the Western Conference coach due to the Spurs having the second-best record in the West. The Cleveland Cavaliers had the best record in the Eastern Conference, but on January 22, the team fired head coach David Blatt and replaced him with Tyronn Lue. Lue was named the Eastern Conference head coach on January 27, even though he had only coached four games up to that point.

Rosters

The rosters for the All-Star Game were selected through a voting process. The starters are chosen by the fans. Two guards and three frontcourt players who received the highest vote are named the All-Star starters. NBA head coaches vote for the reserves for their respective conferences, none of which can be players on their own team. Each coach selects two guards, three frontcourt players and two wild cards, with each selected player ranked in order of preference within each category. If a multi-position player is to be selected, coaches are encouraged to vote for the player at the position that was "most advantageous for the All-Star team," regardless of where the player was listed on the All-Star ballot or the position he was listed in box scores.

Kobe Bryant of the Los Angeles Lakers topped the ballots this year with 1,891,614 votes, earning Bryant his 18th all-star appearance in his final season in the NBA, and also beating out the 2015 leading vote getter Stephen Curry of the Golden State Warriors, who was second this year in total votes with 1,604,325. This is the fourth time that Bryant has been the leading vote getter. The other players named to the Western Conference starting roster include Russell Westbrook and Kevin Durant of the Oklahoma City Thunder, named to their fifth and seventh All-Star Games respectively, and Kawhi Leonard of the San Antonio Spurs, who was named to his first career All-Star Game.

LeBron James of the Cleveland Cavaliers, with 1,089,206 votes, was the leading vote getter in the Eastern Conference, earning James his 12th career all-star nod. Dwyane Wade of the Miami Heat was also named a starter to his 12th career All-Star Game, with a total of 941,466 votes. Rounding out the rest of the Eastern Conference starting lineup was Kyle Lowry of the Toronto Raptors (second all-star nod), Paul George of the Indiana Pacers (3rd all-star nod), and Carmelo Anthony of the New York Knicks, who was named to his ninth career All-Star Game.

The West Reserves included Klay Thompson and Draymond Green of the Golden State Warriors, Chris Paul of the Los Angeles Clippers, James Harden of the Houston Rockets, Anthony Davis of the New Orleans Pelicans, DeMarcus Cousins of the Sacramento Kings, and LaMarcus Aldridge, who made the All-Star Game as a member of the San Antonio Spurs for the first time.

The East Reserves included John Wall of the Washington Wizards, DeMar DeRozan of the Toronto Raptors, Jimmy Butler of the Chicago Bulls, Isaiah Thomas of the Boston Celtics, Chris Bosh of the Miami Heat, Paul Millsap of the Atlanta Hawks, and Andre Drummond of the Detroit Pistons. Jimmy Butler and Chris Bosh ultimately had to sit out the All-Star Game due to a knee and calf injury, respectively. Pau Gasol of the Chicago Bulls and Al Horford of the Atlanta Hawks were named as Butler and Bosh's replacements.

 Jimmy Butler was unable to participate due to a knee injury.
 Pau Gasol was selected as Butler's replacement.
 Chris Bosh was unable to participate due to a calf injury.
 Al Horford was selected as Bosh's replacement.

Game

Russell Westbrook earned his second-straight MVP award in his first All-Star start as the West won 196–173 over the East. He scored a team-high 31 points and added eight rebounds, five assists, and five steals in 22 minutes. Kobe Bryant, who planned to retire after the season, had 10 points, six rebounds, and seven assists in his final All-Star Game. The 369 total points in the game broke the previous year's record by 48, and both sides exceeded the prior team record of 163.

Stephen Curry added 26 points for the West, and teammates Anthony Davis scored 24 on 12-of-13 shooting and Kevin Durant  tallied 23. The East's Paul George scored 41, which tied Westbrook's total from 2015 and was one short of Wilt Chamberlain's record. LeBron James totaled 13 points for a career record of 291 to pass Bryant, who retired with 290.

Westbrook became the first black player in All-Star history to win consecutive MVPs outright. Bob Pettit is the other player to have won back-to-back awards, winning in 1958 and sharing it with Elgin Baylor in 1959. West players offered to feed Bryant the ball in an attempt to get him a record fifth All-Star MVP, but he declined.

All-Star Weekend

Celebrity Game

Rising Stars Challenge

Skills Challenge

Patrick Beverley was unable to participate due to an ankle injury.
Emmanuel Mudiay was selected to replace Beverley.

Three-Point Contest

Teammates Stephen Curry and Klay Thompson of the Golden State Warriors, known as the Splash Brothers, were the favorites to win the contest.  The betting site, Bovada, listed the defending-champion Curry as the favorite to win with 10–11 odds, while Thompson was second at 9–2. Contestant Devin Booker would be the youngest participant to ever compete in the Three-Point contest at 19 years old. Chris Bosh was announced as a first-time participant for the event, but he would be replaced by CJ McCollum due to an injury before the event.

 Chris Bosh was unable to participate due to a calf injury.
 CJ McCollum was selected as Bosh's replacement.

 – Indicates score from 30-second tiebreaker

Slam Dunk Contest

Zach LaVine became the first back-to-back Slam Dunk Contest winner since Nate Robinson, edging out Aaron Gordon with four consecutive perfect scores in the final round.

References

National Basketball Association All-Star Game
All-Star
Basketball competitions in Toronto
NBA All-Star Game
2015–16 in Canadian basketball
February 2016 sports events in Canada
Toronto Raptors
ABS-CBN television specials